Kate Jackson (born 1948) is an American actress and filmmaker.

Kate Jackson may also refer to:

Kate Jackson (author) (born 1972), herpetologist
Kate Jackson (fighter) (born 1986), British mixed martial artist
Kate Jackson (politician) in Massachusetts House of Representatives elections, 2006
Kate Jackson (singer) (born 1979), lead singer of the UK indie band The Long Blondes

See also
Katherine Jackson (disambiguation)